Aspergillus iizukae is a species of fungus in the genus Aspergillus. It is from the Flavipedes section. The species was first described in 1967.

Growth and morphology

A. iizukae has been cultivated on both Czapek yeast extract agar (CYA) plates and Malt Extract Agar Oxoid® (MEAOX) plates. The growth morphology of the colonies can be seen in the pictures below.

References 

iizukae
Fungi described in 1967